"The Difference" is a song by Australian electronic musician Flume and American singer/songwriter and producer Toro y Moi, released through Future Classic on 11 March 2020 as a standalone single. The song featured in an advert for Apple AirPods Pro.
 
Upon release, Flume wrote, "We made this song between a day at my place in LA and a day at Chaz's spot in Oakland. This was our first time working together." Flume said he has been a fan of Toro y Moi "for a while" and lists the song "Talamak" as a "long time favourite".
 
The song was nominated for the Grammy Award for Best Dance Recording at the 63rd Annual Grammy Awards (2021).

Music video
An official music video premiered on YouTube on 11 March 2020. It was directed by long-time Flume collaborator, Jonathan Zawada.

Track listings

Original version 
 "The Difference" – 2:20

Remixes EP 
 "The Difference"  – 5:26
 "The Difference"  – 5:05
 "The Difference"  – 3:54
 "The Difference"  – 3:19
 "The Difference"  – 4:55
 "The Difference"  – 3:57

Charts

Weekly charts

Year-end charts

Release history

References

 

2020 songs
2020 singles
Flume (musician) songs
Toro y Moi songs
Song recordings produced by Flume (musician)
Songs written by Flume (musician)
Songs written by Toro y Moi